The Elephant Head Lodge is a guest lodge on the road to, and only 12 miles from, the east entrance of Yellowstone National Park, in Shoshone National Forest. The ranch includes two main lodges surrounded by support buildings and guest cabins. Beginning in 1926, the Elephant Head was developed by Buffalo Bill Cody's niece, Josephine Thurston and her husband Harry W. Thurston.  The lodge was named after a distinctive rock formation that rises above the property.

References

External links
Elephant Head Lodge at the Wyoming State Historic Preservation Office

Houses completed in 1926
Houses in Park County, Wyoming
Dude ranches in Wyoming
Houses on the National Register of Historic Places in Wyoming
Rustic architecture in Wyoming
Shoshone National Forest
Historic districts on the National Register of Historic Places in Wyoming
National Register of Historic Places in Park County, Wyoming
1926 establishments in Wyoming